Heidar-Ali Arfaa (1919 Shiraz, Iran – 1976 Tehran, Iran) was Conseiller d'État to Shah Mohammad Reza Pahlavi of Iran. His role as the high counsellor was discharged concurrently with a cabinet-level position as Minister of Agriculture, and as the elected Député-Majlis from Fars Province (Parliamentary Seatholder).

Senator Arfaa is most notable for authoring legislation of the White Revolution concerning Land Reform, Privatization of Government Enterprises, Women's Suffrage, Nationalization of Forests and Pasturelands,  and Profit Sharing for Industrial Workers.

See also 
List of Iranians

References 

 
 H. Delegates and observers attending the ninth session of the conference
 J. Delegates and observers attending the tenth session of the conference
 B. Delegates and observers attending the eleventh session of the conference
 REPORT OF THE COUNCIL OF FAO Thirty-Seventh Session, 24–25 November 1961 (Contd.)
 REPORT OF THE COUNCIL OF FAO Twenty-Ninth Session - 27 October – 7 November 1958
 REPORT OF THE COUNCIL OF FAO Thirty-Second Session, 29–30 October 1959
 REPORT OF THE COUNCIL OF FAO Thirty-First Session, 15–24 June 1959 (Contd.)

1919 births
1976 deaths
Members of the National Consultative Assembly
Agriculture ministers of Iran
People from Shiraz